Scopifera is a genus of moths of the family Erebidae. The genus was erected by Gottlieb August Wilhelm Herrich-Schäffer in 1870.

Species
Scopifera antelia (H. Druce, 1891) Panama
Scopifera antorides (H. Druce, 1891) Mexico
Scopifera falsirenalis Schaus, 1916 Mexico
Scopifera insurrecta Dyar, 1918 Mexico
Scopifera lycagusalis (Walker, [1859]) Venezuela
Scopifera lygdus (H. Druce, 1891) Guatemala
Scopifera menippusalis (Walker, [1859]) Venezuela, Brazil
Scopifera mirabilis (Butler, 1889) Jamaica
Scopifera phrygialis Schaus, 1916 Costa Rica
Scopifera poasalis (Schaus, 1913) Costa Rica

References

Herminiinae